Chinkana (Quechua for labyrinth) is an archaeological site in Bolivia situated on the Isla del Sol, an island of Lake Titicaca. It is located in the La Paz Department, Manco Kapac Province, Copacabana Municipality.

See also 
 Iñaq Uyu
 Pillkukayna

References 

Archaeological sites in Bolivia
Buildings and structures in La Paz Department (Bolivia)
Tourist attractions in La Paz Department (Bolivia)